Guillermo Burgara Velasquez (born April 23, 1968) is a Mexican former Major League Baseball first baseman and outfielder who played parts of two seasons for the San Diego Padres from –. He batted left-handed and threw right-handed.

Playing career
Velasquez was signed by the Padres after the  season from the Sultanes de Monterrey of the Mexican League. He spent the next 6 seasons in the Padres minor league system, playing on teams including the Single-A Riverside Red Wave, Double-A Wichita Wranglers, and Triple-A Las Vegas Stars. He spent most of the 1992 season in Las Vegas before being called up to the major league club that September.

He began the 1993 season in San Diego before being sent back to Triple-A Las Vegas in June. After playing 30 games with the Stars, he was called back up to the big leagues after the Padres traded Fred McGriff to the Atlanta Braves. His final major league game was on October 3, 1993 against the Chicago Cubs.

References

External links

1968 births
Living people
Baseball players from Baja California
Charlotte Knights players
Las Vegas Stars (baseball) players
Major League Baseball first basemen
Major League Baseball left fielders
Major League Baseball right fielders
Major League Baseball players from Mexico
Mexican expatriate baseball players in Canada
Mexican expatriate baseball players in the United States
Mexican League baseball first basemen
New Britain Red Sox players
Ottawa Lynx players
Sportspeople from Mexicali
Pericos de Puebla players
Petroleros de Minatitlán players
Riverside Red Wave players
San Diego Padres players
Tigres de la Angelopolis players
Wichita Wranglers players
Broncos de Reynosa players
Charleston Rainbows players
Saraperos de Saltillo players
Sultanes de Monterrey players